The 4th Wildflower Film Awards is an awards ceremony recognizing the achievements of Korean independent and low-budget films. It was held at the Literature House in Seoul on April 12, 2017.

14 prizes were handed out to films nominated across 10 categories for both documentary and narrative works, each with a budget under  and released theatrically between January 1 and December 31, 2016.

Nominations and winners
(Winners denoted in bold)

References

External links 

Wildflower Film Awards
Wildflower Film Awards
Wildflower Film Awards